The Slate Range is located in the Mojave Desert in San Bernardino County, California, southwest of Death Valley and east of Trona.

The mountains lie to the east of Searles Lake and the Argus Range at the southern end of the Panamint Range. The southern part of the range lies in the Naval Air Weapons Station China Lake, which is off-limit to the general public. Manly Pass lies at the northern end of the Slate Range, with Layton Pass at the southern end.

See also
Mountain ranges of the Mojave Desert
North American desert flora
Potash wars (California)

References

California Road and Recreation Atlas, 2005, pg.95

Mountain ranges of Southern California
Mountain ranges of the Mojave Desert
Mountain ranges of San Bernardino County, California